Orlęta Radzyń Podlaski is a Polish football club based in Radzyń Podlaski. The club was established in 1924.

References

External links
 Official website
 Orlęta Radzyń Podlaski at the 90minut.pl website (Polish)

Football clubs in Poland
Association football clubs established in 1924
1924 establishments in Poland
Radzyń Podlaski County
Sport in Lublin Voivodeship